James H. Hibbard (born October 19, 1981 in Palo Alto, California) is an American road racing cyclist who competed for the Shaklee and Health Net-Maxxis professional cycling Teams. He started racing at the Hellyer Park Velodrome in San Jose, California in 1995, and competed through 2005.

Hibbard was the Northern California/ Nevada State Track Cycling Champion at the junior and elite levels, and earned medals at the United States National Track Cycling Championships from 1996–1999 and again in 2001 and 2003. As a member of the United States National Team, he was a bronze medalist at Trinidad and Tobago's Southern Games. Although a member of several UCI professional road cycling teams, Hibbard competed primarily as track cyclist.

Hibbard has been vocal in his support of drug-free sport. In July, 2002 he was profiled by Elliott Almond of the San Jose Mercury News. His correspondence with Irish Tour de France rider, and cycling journalist Paul Kimmage about the problem of performance-enhancing drugs in professional cycling appeared in the preface to the 2007 edition of Kimmage's book Rough Ride. 

Hibbard's memoir, The Art of Cycling was published by Quercus Books and was shortlisted for the 2022 British Sports Book Awards, in the cycling category.

Education
James studied philosophy at the University of California, Santa Cruz.

References

External links

https://penvelo.org/a-look-back-james-hibbard/ Penvelo.org. Retrieved 10 September 2019. 

1981 births
Living people
American male cyclists